Adam's Rib is a 1990 Soviet Tragicomedy film directed by Vyacheslav Krishtofovich.

Plot 
The film tells about the life of the Soviet family. The grandmother is sick and needs attention, the mother still can not establish personal life, and the two daughters are full of problems.

Cast 
 Inna Churikova as Nina
 Yelena Bogdanova as Grandmother
 Svetlana Ryabova as Lidiya
 Mariya Golubkina as Nastya
 Andrey Tolubeev
 Andrei Kasyanov
 Stanislav Zhitaryov	
 Igor Kvasha
 Rostislav Yankovsky
 Galina Kazakova

References

External links 
 
 

1990 films
1990 comedy-drama films
1990s Russian-language films
Soviet comedy-drama films